Kallisto (minor planet designation: 204 Kallisto) is a fairly typical, although sizeable Main belt asteroid. It is classified as an S-type asteroid. Like other asteroids of its type, it is light in colour. It was discovered by Johann Palisa on 8 October 1879, in Pola, and was named after the same nymph Callisto in Greek mythology as Jupiter's moon Callisto.

This result conflicted with previous determinations of the period, so the latter were ruled out.

References

External links 
 The Asteroid Orbital Elements Database
 Minor Planet Discovery Circumstances
 Asteroid Light-curve Parameters
 Asteroid Albedo Compilation
 
 

000204
Discoveries by Johann Palisa
Named minor planets
000204
18791008
Callisto (mythology)